The 2019 RS:X World Championships was held in Torbole, Italy from 22 September to 28 September, 2019.

Medal summary

References

External links
Official website 

Windsurfing World Championships
RS:X World Championships
RS:X World Championships
RS:X World Championships
Sailing in Italy
RS:X World Championships